Al Blades, Jr. is a defensive back for the Miami Hurricanes football team.

High school career
Blades Jr attended St. Thomas Aquinas High School in Fort Lauderdale, Florida. He committed to the University of Miami to play college football.

College career

2018
As a true freshman in 2018, Blades Jr. recorded 13 tackles in 13 games. He played mainly on special teams.

2019
In 2019, Blades Jr. recorded 36 tackles and 2 interceptions in 13 games in which he started 7 of those.

2020
In 2020, he recorded 29 tackles and two interceptions. At the end of the season, Blades Jr. was diagnosed with myocarditis.

References

Living people
American football defensive backs
Miami Hurricanes football players
Year of birth missing (living people)